The Blue Moods of Spain is the debut studio album by American rock band Spain, released on September 8, 1995, on Restless Records.

"Spiritual" was later recorded by Johnny Cash for his album American II: Unchained.

Release 
The tracks "I Lied" and "Dreaming of Love" were released as 7-inch singles. Additionally, a music video was produced for "Untitled #1".

Reception 

In a contemporary review, Melody Maker praised The Blue Moods of Spain as "the most gorgeous music you'll hear all year", describing Spain as "quiet masters of atmosphere, subtle craftsmen who weave a sumptuous, melodic spell with the lightest of instrumental touches". NME noted "a rich, glorious warmth to their songs that combines the melodic simplicity of... The Velvet Underground... the metronomic precision of Spiritualized... and the heartbroken sentiment of the Tindersticks." Richie Unterberger of AllMusic was more reserved in his praise and felt that Spain succeed at evoking "a brooding, late-night atmosphere" with "seductive drones... and melancholy, pensive songs", while adding that the album is "a bit monotonous all at once" and would have benefited from a more expressive vocalist.

In 2004's The New Rolling Stone Album Guide, critic Allison Stewart wrote that The Blue Moods of Spain "made up in style what it lacked in musical variation." In 2012, Kitty Empire of The Observer described the album as "a gem of opiated heartbreak".

Track listing

Personnel 
Credits adapted from liner notes for The Blue Moods of Spain.

Spain
 Josh Haden – vocals, bass guitar, string arrangements
 Ken Boudakian – guitar, organ
 Merlo Podlewski – guitar
 Evan Hartzell – drums

Additional musicians
 Larry Cady – trumpet on "Ray of Light"
 Petra Haden – violin and vocals on "World of Blue", string arrangements
 Tanya Haden – cello on "World of Blue"
 Daniel Presley – string arrangements

Production
 Mike Bogus – engineering (assistant)
 Josh Haden – production
 Norman Kerner – engineering, mixing, production
 Daniel Presley – engineering, mixing
 Peter Slankster – engineering (assistant)

Artwork and design
 Ed Colver – photography
 Pat Dillon – art direction

References

External links 
 [ The Blue Moods of Spain] at AllMusic

1995 debut albums
Spain (band) albums